Psalm 129 is the 129th psalm of the biblical Book of Psalms, one of 15 psalms that begin with the words "A song of ascents" (Shir Hama'alot). The New King James Version calls it "A Song of Victory over Zion’s Enemies", and the Revised Standard Version calls it a "Prayer for the Downfall of Israel’s Enemies", but Albert Barnes notes that the psalm itself is merely entitled "A Song of Degrees" (i.e. a Song of Ascents) and it is not attributed to any author.

In the slightly different numbering system used in the Greek Septuagint version of the bible, and in the Latin Vulgate, this psalm is Psalm 128.

Origin
Barnes argues that this psalm "would be applicable to many periods of the Jewish history, and it is not of such a nature that it can with certainty be referred to any one of them. There is nothing in it which would forbid us to suppose that it was composed on the return from the Babylonian exile, but there is nothing to fix it definitely to that event ... It would seem probable that it was composed during a time of trouble, of war, or of persecution. Why it was made one of the 'Songs of Degrees' is equally unknown".

Uses

Judaism
This psalm is recited following Mincha between Sukkot and Shabbat Hagadol.

Catholic Church
According to ancient tradition from the Middle Ages, this psalm was sung as the last psalm of the office of vespers on Monday, by the Rule of St. Benedict (530). The tract for Passion Sunday (the fifth Sunday of Lent) incorporates verses 1-4.

In the Liturgy of the Hours now, Psalm 129 is sung or recited on the Thursday of the fourth week of the four weekly cycle of liturgical prayers, and in the Office of the middle of the day.

References

External links 

 in Hebrew and English - Mechon-mamre
 King James Bible - Wikisource

129